Tom DeMarco (born August 20, 1940) is an American software engineer, author, and consultant on software engineering topics. He was an early developer of structured analysis in the 1970s.

Early life and education 
Tom DeMarco was born in Hazleton, Pennsylvania. He received a BSEE degree in Electrical Engineering from Cornell University, a M.S. from Columbia University, and a diplôme from the University of Paris.

Career

DeMarco started working at Bell Telephone Laboratories in 1963, where he participated in ESS-1 project to develop the first large scale Electronic Switching System, which became installed in telephone offices all over the world. Later in the 1960s he started working for a French IT consulting firm, where he worked on the development of a conveyor system for the new merchandise mart at La Villette in Paris, and in the 1970s on the development of on-line banking systems in Sweden, Holland, France and New York.

In the 1970s DeMarco was one of the major figures in the development of structured analysis and structured design in software engineering. In January 1978 he published Structured Analysis and System Specification, a major milestone in the field.

In the 1980s with Tim Lister, Stephen McMenamin, John F. Palmer, James Robertson and Suzanne Robertson, he founded the consulting firm "The Atlantic Systems Guild" in New York.
The firm initially shared offices with the Dorset House Publishing owned by Wendy Eachan, Tim Lister's wife. Their company developed into a New York- and London-based consulting company specializing in methods and management of software development.

DeMarco has lectured and consulted throughout the Americas, Europe, Africa, Australia and the Far East. He has also been a technical advisor for ZeniMax Media, the parent company of video game publisher Bethesda Softworks.

He is a member of the ACM and a Fellow of the IEEE. He lives in Camden, Maine, and is a principal of the Atlantic Systems Guild, and a fellow and Senior Consultant of the Cutter Consortium. DeMarco was the 1986 recipient of the Warnier Prize for "lifetime contribution to the field of computing", and the 1999 recipient of the Stevens Award for "contribution to the methods of software development".

Personal life

In his spare time, DeMarco is an emergency medical technician, certified by his home state and by the National Registry of EMTs. He is also founding member of the Penobscot Compact, operating under the auspices of the Maine State Aspirations Program, in which local employers contribute the paid time of their employees to tutor students in the public schools.

Publications 
DeMarco has authored over nine books and 100 papers on project management and software development. A selection:
 1978. Structured Analysis and System Specification. Yourdon, 
 1979. Concise Notes on Software Engineering. Yourdon, 
 1986. Controlling Software Projects: Management, Measurement, and Estimates. Prentice Hall,  
 1987. Peopleware: Productive Projects and Teams. With Timothy Lister. Dorset House. 
 1997. The Deadline: A Novel About Project Management. Dorset House. 
 2001. Slack, Getting Past Burnout, Busywork, and the Myth of Total Efficiency. 
 2002. "The Agile Methods Fray". IEEE Software, 35(6)
 2003. Waltzing with Bears: Managing Risk on Software Projects. With Tim Lister. Dorset House in March 2003. 
 2008. Adrenaline Junkies and Template Zombies: Understanding Patterns of Project Behavior. With Peter Hruschka, Tim Lister, Suzanne Robertson, James Robertson, Steve McMenamin. 
 2009. 
 2013. Andronescu's Paradox. Amazon Digital Services, Inc. ASIN B00C9GVDY0

See also 
 Software metric
 Software quality
 Structured Systems Analysis and Design Method

References

External links

Tom DeMarco's home page
The Atlantic Systems Guild website
Cutter Consortium website

1940 births
American technology writers
Cornell University College of Engineering alumni
Living people
American software engineers
Writers from Pennsylvania
People from Hazleton, Pennsylvania
Fellow Members of the IEEE
Software engineering researchers
Engineers from Pennsylvania
Columbia University alumni
University of Paris alumni
American expatriates in France